Petrovsky Passage is an elite department store opened on Petrovka Street in downtown Moscow in 1906. The engineer Vladimir Shukhov, also responsible for the GUM and the Shabolovka tower, designed a covered arcade with two wide three-storey galleries covered with high-pitched semi-cylindrical glass vaulting. The second storeys of opposite galleries are connected by exquisitely designed ferroconcrete catwalks. In the 1990s, the shop was revamped as the centre of one of the most expensive shopping areas in Europe.

Gallery

See also

Tretyakov Drive
The Passage

Department stores of Russia
Buildings and structures in Moscow
Roof structures by Vladimir Shukhov
Department stores of the Soviet Union
Commercial buildings completed in 1906
1906 establishments in the Russian Empire
Cultural heritage monuments of federal significance in Moscow